Parker Conrad (born 1980) is cofounder of Rippling, a cloud-based human resources platform designed to assist with onboarding, payroll, benefits, and vacation tracking. Prior to starting Rippling, he was the cofounder and CEO of Zenefits.

Early life

Conrad was born in New York City to Ellen Rouse Conrad, a president and founder of the non-profit environmental group the Bedford 2020 Coalition, and Winthrop B. Conrad, Jr., a now retired senior partner at the New York law firm Davis Polk & Wardwell. He attended the prestigious Upper West Side preparatory school The Collegiate School, and spent nearly two years during high school studying the neurobiology of  sea snails. This research ultimately won him $20,000 and third place nationally in the  Westinghouse Talent Search. Despite this early display of an evident talent for science, Parker admits that his high school grades were generally mediocre.

In the fall of 1998 Conrad began studying at Harvard University, where he served as managing editor of The Harvard Crimson. Conrad cites his time at the paper as an incredibly stressful period that ultimately led to his taking a leave of absence from school. "I was spending all my time at the Crimson, like 70 hours a week and I didn’t go to class for like a year," he told Business Insider in February 2015. "But then I failed out of school. I had to leave Harvard, really halfway through my tenure as the Crimson managing editor. It was this incredibly humiliating and shocking experience." However, Conrad returned to finish his studies one year later, and graduated in 2003 with an AB degree in Chemistry.

Conrad was diagnosed, treated and cleared of testicular cancer at the age of 24.

Career

Conrad was a product manager at Amgen, a biotechnology firm. While at Amgen, Conrad co-founded a portfolio-management startup called Wikinvest (now SigFig) with Mike Sha. After a falling out with Sha in 2012, Conrad left the company.

Inspired by the recent launch of President Obama's Affordable Care Act and his own experience as a cancer patient, Conrad launched Zenefits in September 2012. The company quickly took off, receiving millions in early funding rounds from top-tier venture capital firms such as Andreessen Horowitz and Institutional Venture Partners. In 2014, Zenefits was named the fastest-growing startup of the year. Its annual revenues grew from $20 million in 2014 to $100 million in 2015. After only two years of existence, the company had 1,600 employees, 10,000 customers, and a $4.5 billion valuation.

In May 2015, Conrad made the news after he revoked a job offer he made to an engineer who asked for advice on the question-and-answer website Quora about whether he should accept a job offer from Zenefits or Uber.

In the fall of 2015, Zenefits came under scrutiny for allegedly failing to comply with state health insurance regulations; the company was subject to an investigation by the website BuzzFeed. On 8 February 2016, Conrad resigned from Zenefits after it was discovered the company used unlicensed brokers to sell health insurance in multiple states.  In the aftermath of the investigation, Conrad's replacement as CEO, former COO David O. Sacks—who was cleared of wrongdoing in the same investigation—announced that the valuation of the company would be halved and investors' positions "trued up" in an effort at rectification, while 10% of employees accepted an offer of a two-month separation package.

In 2015, Conrad was listed as Number 20 on Fortune's 40 Under Forty list.

References

Living people
American technology chief executives
The Harvard Crimson people
1980 births